TRUMPET (also known as JEROBOAM and called Advanced Jumpseat by some observers) is reportedly a series of ELINT reconnaissance satellites launched by the United States during the 1990s to replace the Jumpseat satellites.  Speculated to weigh 5,200 kg, three of these satellites were launched into highly elliptical (Molniya) orbits by Titan 4 launch vehicles from Cape Canaveral between 1994 and 1997.  Their precise mission and capabilities are classified. News reports state that the satellites monitor radio communication using antennas with diameters of 150 m. It is speculated that the satellites are manufactured by Boeing.

Design
According to NASA's National Space Science Data Center, Trumpet SIGINT satellites have a large deployable mesh antenna, and were initially aimed at monitoring Soviet communications and missile tests.
Trumpet 5 is allegedly the second satellite of a new series. Its tasks are believed to be signals intelligence and early warning, using a SBIRS HEO-2 infrared missile early warning package. In addition it is supposed to carry a NASA/Los Alamos TWINS-B magnetospheric research payload.

Launches

Cost
In 1994, the cost of Trumpet 1 (excluding launch vehicle) were estimated to more than US$1.5 billion (inflation adjusted more than US$  billion in ).

See also
 Jonathan's Space Report

References

External links
Trumpet SIGINT at Encyclopedia Astronautica

Reconnaissance satellites of the United States
Signals intelligence satellites
Military equipment introduced in the 1990s